Ney Mello  is an American  jazz guitarist, composer, and producer. He is considered an expert in guitar picking.

Discography
 1985: Electric Music
 1991: Voyages of Fire
 1993: Live at Blues Alley
 1994: Meditations
 2014:  "Elementi Eterni" with guest artist Robert Muncy (iTunes release)

DVD
 2008: Maximum Speed Picking with Ney Mello

As soloist
 "Elementi Eterni" with guest artist Robert Muncy 2014
 "The Return of M2" by Michael Myrose (M2), 2011
 Inner Vision with Teo Graca and Chris Vadala
 Second vision with Teo Graca and Chris Vadala
 Heaven Shines by Sherrece
 No More Denying by Sherrece
 Back in the Day by Teo Graca

Produced
 1985: Electric Music
 1991: Voyages of Fire
 1993: Live at Blues Alley
 1994: Meditations
 2008: The Tragedy of Cleopatra by The Phoenixx
 2014:  "Elementi Eterni" with guest artist Robert Muncy

References

External links
 Official Website

Date of birth missing (living people)
Living people
American jazz composers
American jazz guitarists
American record producers
Catholic University of America alumni
Male guitarists
Male jazz composers
People from Porto Alegre
Year of birth missing (living people)